The following radio stations broadcast on FM frequency 76.1 MHz:

Brazil
Rádio Jornal in Recife

Japan
JOFW-FM, Fukuoka, Kyushu
JOZZ6AB-FM, Hamamatsu, Shizuoka

References

Lists of radio stations by frequency